Dhamura is a business center in Barisal District (Bangladesh).

The population of Dhamura was 8889 in 2016.

References

Populated places in Barisal District